Moreton Bay Central Sports Complex is a sports field complex in Burpengary, a suburb of the Moreton Bay Region, Queensland, Australia. It was built and opened in 2013 and are managed by Caboolture Sports Football Club, Moreton Bay Australian Football Club and AFL Queensland's Northern Brisbane Academy Programs. It is the home ground for Caboolture Sports Football Club, playing within Football Queensland competitions, and also the home ground for Moreton Bay in the Queensland Football Association Northern Conference. It is also the primary home ground for the Brisbane Lions AFL Women's team.

Soccer
Caboolture Sports Football Club are located in the Moreton Bay Regional Sports Complex. This complex was opened in May 2019 & is a New Multi-million dollar purpose built Football Facility. The clubhouse is surrounded by a synthetic field and two full size fields. Additionally, 3 more full size fields are planned to be constructed. Caboolture Sports FC is an established, progressive club and in 2016 re-affiliated with Football Brisbane (now Football Queensland Metro) after being part of Sunshine Coast Football for 20 years. The club's senior men side currently play in the Football Queensland Premier League and also has many successful junior teams playing in Football Queensland Metro competitions. The senior women field a Women's Capital 1 League and reserve team. Caboolture Sports FC turned 50 years in 2019 and now have an active membership of over 850 players, ranging from Miniroos, juniors, boys and girls, City league and Over 45's, plus a newly established 7-a-side preseason competition.

AFL
The Brisbane Lions' AFL Women's (AFLW) team uses the venue as a home ground. It became the Lions' primary home ground for the 2019 season, replacing South Pine Sports Complex.

It has also served as a home ground for the club's reserves team in the NEAFL; and it has hosted AFL pre-season games involving the Brisbane Lions since it was opened.

Attendance records

References

External links

Moreton Bay Central Sports Complex at Moreton Bay Regional Council
Moreton Bay Central Sports Complex at Austadiums

Brisbane Lions
North East Australian Football League grounds
AFL Women's grounds
Sports venues completed in 2013
2013 establishments in Australia
Multi-purpose stadiums in Australia
Sports venues in Queensland
Sports complexes in Australia